Samy Derras (born 7 June 1988) is a French football midfielder of Algerian descent.

Spartak Trnava
He made his debut for Spartak Myjava against Spartak Myjava on 29 July 2012.

References

External links
http://www.iltempo.it/sport/2006/04/07/torna-de-rossi-1.570428
http://www.transfermarketweb.com/index.php/www.superlignews.com/2010/03/colin-kazim-interview-part-1-english.html?action=read&idsel=2737
Spartak Trnava profile

1988 births
Living people
Algerian footballers
French footballers
Association football midfielders
A.C.N. Siena 1904 players
FC Spartak Trnava players
Slovak Super Liga players
Expatriate footballers in Italy
Expatriate footballers in Spain
Expatriate footballers in Slovakia
French sportspeople of Algerian descent
French expatriate footballers
Algerian expatriate sportspeople in Italy
Algerian expatriate sportspeople in Spain
Algerian expatriate sportspeople in Slovakia
Footballers from Paris
Lorca Atlético CF players